Kenneth D. Karlin was born in October 30, 1948 in Pasadena, California, a professor of chemistry at Johns Hopkins University in Baltimore, Maryland.  Research in his group focuses on coordination chemistry relevant to biological and environmental processes, involving copper or heme complexes. Of particular interest are reactivities of such complexes with nitrogen oxides, O2, and the oxidation of substrates by the resultant compounds. He is also the Editor-in-Chief of the book series Progress in Inorganic Chemistry.

Awards and honors 
 Maryland Chemist of the Year Award (American Chemical Society Maryland Section), 2011
 F. Albert Cotton Award in Synthetic Inorganic Chemistry, 2009
 2009 Sierra Nevada Distinguished Chemist Award
 Appointed to Ira Remsen Chair in Chemistry, Johns Hopkins University, May 1999.
 Elected Chair, 1998 Metals in Biology Gordon Research Conference
 "MERIT" Award, 1993–2003, National Institute of General Medical Sciences (NIH)
 Fellow, American Association for the Advancement of Science (AAAS) – elected October, 1992
 1991 Buck-Whitney Award (ACS Eastern New York Section Research Award)
 University "Excellence in Research" Award, SUNY at Albany, 1988
 General Electric Visiting Faculty Research Fellow, GE R&D Center, Schenectady, NY, 1986–87

Positions 
 1977–1983	          Assistant Professor: Department of Chemistry, SUNY at Albany, Albany, NY
 1983–1987	          Associate Professor: Department of Chemistry, SUNY at Albany, Albany, NY
 1987–1990	          Professor: Department of Chemistry, SUNY at Albany, Albany, NY
 1990–present	  Professor: Department of Chemistry, Johns Hopkins University, Baltimore, MD
 2009–present Professor: Department of Bioinspired Science, WCU Program, MOBIC (Metal Oxygen BioInspired Chemistry) Group Ewha Womans University Seoul, KOREA

Personal 
Karlin is the son of Stanford mathematician Samuel Karlin.

References 

1948 births
Living people
21st-century American chemists
Fellows of the American Association for the Advancement of Science
Inorganic chemists
Johns Hopkins University faculty
Columbia University alumni